Borne, Germany may refer to:
Borne, a district of Bad Belzig, Brandenburg
Borne, Saxony-Anhalt